Midland Holdings Limited is one of the largest real estate brokerage companies in Hong Kong. It provides residential, industrial and commercial property brokerage services in Hong Kong, Macau and the People's Republic of China.

The company was established in 1973 by Mr. Freddie Wong Kin Yip and started as a small real estate agency in Mei Foo Sun Chuen, Kowloon. It was listed on Hong Kong Stock Exchange in 1995.

Its main competitor in Hong Kong and Macau is Centaline Holdings.

Corporate Development
In December 2018, it was reported that Freddie Wong had offered to buy 57.44 million shares of Midland Holdings from qualified shareholders at a market premium of 28% over recent closing price, making the effective offer price at HKD 2.00 per share. This could increase his and his connected parties' shareholding of the company from 27% to 35%.

Disputes
In the 2014 June annual general meeting of the company, the management team was questioned by the company's second largest shareholder, Apex Benchmark on over payment of remuneration to directors of the company.  Apex Benchmark held 10.54% of company shares while Freddie Wong and family held 27.89%.  Thereafter, Midland Holdings had requested law enforcement agency to investigate into Apex Benchmark about its bad mouthing the company.

In August 2014, the deputy chairman of Midland Holdings, Angela Wong had said that the company would sue its shareholder Apex Benchmark for damaging the company's reputation.

References

External links

Midland Holdings Limited
Midland Realty

Companies listed on the Hong Kong Stock Exchange
Real estate companies established in 1973
Property agencies of Hong Kong
1973 establishments in Hong Kong